Frank M. Faircloth aka Francis Marion Faircloth (1820 – January 6, 1900) was an American naval officer who served in the Union Navy during the Civil War.

Born near Newark, New Jersey, Frank Faircloth became a sailor at an early age. He participated in the Mexican–American War and the Civil War. In the latter conflict, as the captain of the Boston, he ordered the ship burned to prevent its capture by the Confederate Navy.

During the Spanish–American War, Faircloth, at the age of 78, commanded the transport Seguranca. He also served as the captain of a Ward Line steamer. At the time of his death he had the title of Port Captain of the recently captured Cuban city of Santiago.

On Tuesday, January 2, 1900, suffering from a fever, Frank Faircloth returned to his home at 110 Clinton Avenue in Jersey City, New Jersey, where he died the following Saturday night at the age of 79.

He was laid to rest at Green Wood Cemetery in Brooklyn NY Section 162, lot 15491, grave 2

See also

References
Frank Faircloth obituary (January 8, 1900): The New York Times, page 7. "Santiago Port Captain Dead"

Conflicting dates of his birth.  Passport Application in 1895 shows birthdate 17 January 1833.  Cemetery records show 1830

Union Navy officers
United States Navy personnel of the Mexican–American War
People of the Spanish–American War
People from Jersey City, New Jersey
Military personnel from Newark, New Jersey
People of New Jersey in the American Civil War
1820 births
1900 deaths
Date of birth unknown